The discography of Fefe Dobson, a Canadian pop rock singer-songwriter, consists of two released studio albums, one digital album, fourteen singles (including four as a featured artist), fifteen music videos and a number of other appearances.

Her debut album, Fefe Dobson (2003), topped the Billboard Heatseekers Albums chart and generated three top-20 singles on the Canadian Singles Chart, including the top-10 hits "Bye Bye Boyfriend" and "Don't Go (Girls and Boys)". After a period of commercial decline stemming from the shelved release of her intended second album, Sunday Love, Dobson returned in 2010 with Joy. The album's three singles all reached the top 20 on the Canadian Hot 100 chart and were certified Gold or Platinum by Music Canada.

Albums

Studio albums

Digital albums

Singles

As lead artist

As featured artist

Promotional singles

Music videos

Miscellaneous appearances 
 Nokia Unwired Tour 2003 sampler (2003) (song: "Take Me Away")
 women with a voice compilation (2004) (song: "Everything")
 The Perfect Score soundtrack (2004) (songs: "Everything", "Unforgiven")
O Canada (2004) (song: "Bye Bye Boyfriend")
 Now That's What I Call Music 15 (2004) (song: "Everything")
 Raising Helen soundtrack (2004) (song: "If You Walk Away")
 MuchDance 2005 compilation (2004) (song: "Truth Anthem")
 TeleToon Toon Trax 2 compilation (2004) (song: "Bye Bye Boyfriend")
 YTV Big Fun Party Mix Vol 6 compilation (2005) (song: "Don't Go")
 Juno Awards compilation (2005) (song: "Take Me Away")
 It's a Boy Girl Thing soundtrack (2006) (song: "Be Strong")
 MuchDance 2011 compilation (2010) (song: "Ghost")
 Radioactive album (2011) (song: "Animal")
 Degrassi: Music from Season 13, Vol. 1 compilation (2013) (song: "Legacy")
 Degrassi: Music from Season 13, Vol. 1 2.0 compilation (2014) (song: "Charge")

Songs in other media

Songwriting
Commercially released cover versions or songs written by Fefe Dobson recorded by other artists.

Notes

References

Discographies of Canadian artists
Pop music discographies
Rock music discographies